Megachile pilicrus is a species of bee in the family Megachilidae. It was described by Morawitz in 1877.

References

Pilicrus
Insects described in 1877